Otis Leonard Wheelock (1816 - 1893) was an architect in upstate New York and Chicago. He and his wife had two adopted children, a son Harry B. Wheelock who was an architect and a daughter.

George H. Harlow studied under him.

He was a partner of W. W. Boyington in the firm of Boyington & Wheelock. He also partnered with William Wilson Clay. George Beaumont and Minard Lefever Beers are architects who worked at his firms.

Works
 Paddock Arcade (1850) at Washington St. between Arsenal and Store Sts. in Watertown, New York (NRHP listed by Wheelock,Otis L.)
Oscar Taylor House (1857), NRHP listed
 Union Park Congregational Church and Carpenter Chapel’s Revival chapel
Burbank–Livingston–Griggs House (1862), NRHP listed
Groesbeck House (1869), 1304 W. Washington Boulevard, a Chicago Landmark
Wheeler–Kohn House (1870), NRHP listed 
2550 S. Michigan (demolished)
2808 S. Prairie (1886) with William Wilson Clay
2919 S. Prairie for Frank Granger Logan (demolished)
Michigan and Prairie Avenue mansions with
Wheeler Kohn Home at 2018 S. Calumet Ave. a Chicago landmark restored and operated as a bed and breakfast
Henry A. Chapin House (1882), 508 E. Main St. Niles, MI Wheelock & Clay NRHP listed

References

External links
Findagrave entry
Jeffcowiki entry

American architects
1893 deaths
1816 births